Princeton Free Will Baptist Church, formerly Thankful Baptist Church, is a historic church building at 104 Water Street in 
Johnson City, Tennessee.

The brick church was built in 1912 to serve Thankful Baptist Church, an African-American congregation. Thankful Baptist Church moved to a new location on Watauga Avenue in 1975. In 1977, the congregation sold the Water Street church property to Princeton Free Will Baptist Church.

The building was added to the National Register of Historic Places in 2001.

References

Baptist churches in Tennessee
Churches on the National Register of Historic Places in Tennessee
Churches in Washington County, Tennessee
Johnson City, Tennessee
National Register of Historic Places in Washington County, Tennessee